The 1983 Karnataka State Legislative Assembly election was held in the Indian state of Karnataka to elect 224 members of the Karnataka Legislative Assembly. The elections resulted in a hung assembly with the Janata Party emerging as the single largest party winning 95 seats. Later,  Janata Party leader Ramakrishna Hegde formed the first non-Congress government in Karnataka with the support of BJP and other smaller parties.

Results

!colspan=10|
|- align=center
!style="background-color:#E9E9E9" class="unsortable"|
!style="background-color:#E9E9E9" align=center|Political Party
!style="background-color:#E9E9E9" |Seats Contested
!style="background-color:#E9E9E9" |Seats Won
!style="background-color:#E9E9E9" |Number of Votes
!style="background-color:#E9E9E9" |% of Votes
!style="background-color:#E9E9E9" |Seat change
|-
| 
|align="left"|Janata Party||193||95||4,272,318||33.07%|| 36
|-
| 
|align="left"|Indian National Congress||221||82||5,221,419||40.42%|| 67
|-
| 
|align="left"|Bharatiya Janata Party||110||18||1,024,892||7.93%|| 18
|-
| 
|align="left"|Communist Party of India||7||3||161,192||1.25%||
|-
| 
|align="left"|Communist Party of India (Marxist)||4||3||115,320||0.89%|| 3
|-
| 
|align="left"|All India Anna Dravida Munnetra Kazhagam||1||1||16,234||0.13%|| 1
|-
| 
|align="left"|Independents||751||22||1,998,256||15.47%|| 12
|-
|
|align="left"|Total||1365||224||12,919,459||||
|-
|}

Elected members

References

Karnataka
State Assembly elections in Karnataka
1980s in Karnataka